John James McNeill (1868 – 14 June 1943) was an Australian politician and trade unionist. He was a member of the Australian Labor Party (ALP) and served two terms in the House of Representatives (1922–1925, 1929–1931), representing the Division of Wannon in Victoria. He was Minister for Health and Minister for Repatriation from 1931 to 1932, holding office in the government of his brother-in-law James Scullin.

Early life
McNeill was born in Tantanoola, South Australia. After achieving a primary school education, McNeill worked as a shearer and then became a selector at Woosang.  He sold his farm to prospect for gold during the Coolgardie, Western Australia gold rush and then returned to Victoria to farm at Macarthur before becoming an organiser for the Australian Workers' Union (AWU) in western Victoria and the Riverina of New South Wales. He married Mary Ann Mills in 1896, but she died in 1905.

McNeill contested the Victorian Legislative Assembly seat of Glenelg for Australian Labor Party in 1906.  In 1908 he tried to farm in Roma, Queensland and then became an AWU organiser in Charleville.  From 1913 to 1922 he was secretary of the Victoria-Riverina branch of the AWU.  In 1915, he married James Scullin's sister, Catherine.

Federal Parliament
McNeill narrowly won the seat of Wannon in the House of Representatives in 1922 but was beaten in 1925. He won it back in 1929.

On 2 March 1931, dissatisfaction with the economic performance of the Scullin Government and internal rivalries within the Labor Caucus resulted in the Caucus declaring all ministerial positions vacant and subsequently a new ministry was elected.  McNeill was elected to cabinet and was allocated the portfolios of Health and Repatriation. He kept these positions until the Scullin Government resigned on 6 January 1932.  He lost his parliamentary seat at the December 1931 general election.

Later life
McNeill was the General President of the Australian Workers' Union from 1939 until his death in the Sydney suburb of Coogee of a coronary occlusion.  He was survived by his wife and their two sons, and his two sons and a daughter of his first marriage.

References

Members of the Cabinet of Australia
Members of the Australian House of Representatives for Wannon
Australian Labor Party members of the Parliament of Australia
Australian trade unionists
1868 births
1943 deaths
20th-century Australian politicians
Australian Ministers for Health